Tina Sloan (born February 1, 1943) is an American actress, best known for originating and playing the part of  nurse Lillian Raines on the CBS daytime drama Guiding Light from 1983 until the show's final broadcast in 2009. Her previous leading roles on daytime television have included scheming Kate Thornton Cannell on Somerset (1974–76), troubled Patti Barron McCleary on Search for Tomorrow (1976–78), and Dr. Olivia Delaney on Another World (1980–81). Sloan's role as Lillian Raines endeared her and over the years, Lillian became one of the show's "guiding lights," a noble woman whose troubled past made her stronger and kept her morally grounded. Sloan has published three books, "Changing Shoes," a nonfiction book about aging gracefully and with humor, and two fiction books in her romance thriller series, "Chasing Cleopatra," and  "Chasing Othello."

Early life and career
Sloan attended The Ursuline School and Manhattanville College.  Sloan studied acting with Bob McAndrew and Warren Robertson.

Artistic career
In addition to her daytime television drama career (above), Sloan has appeared in the following films:

Black Swan (2010)
Happy New Year (2010)
Oh My Love (2010)
The Brave One (2007)
Well Fed and Comfortable (2006)
The Guru (2002)
Changing Lanes (2002)
People I Know (2002)
The Curse of the Jade Scorpion (2001)
Celebrity (1998)

She has also appeared in the following television shows:
Law & Order: Special Victims Unit as Camilla Hartnell on "Privilege" episode (2003)
Third Watch as Celeste Malcolm-Queeg, Episode 2.20 "Man Enough" (2001)
Wide World Mystery as Donna in "Too Easy to Kill" (1975)

Sloan appeared in the web series Venice: The Series. In 2014, she played Louise Cassell in the soap opera web series Beacon Hill.

She has appeared in the following plays:
Changing Shoes, touring the U.S. and off-Broadway, NYC
Mine, off-Broadway, NYC
The Labor Party, off-off Broadway, NYC

Chasing Cleopatra 
Sloan's first work of fiction is a novel of love, betrayal, and suspense called Chasing Cleopatra, published February 1, 2020. A perfect cocktail of spy, thriller and romance which takes place in Honolulu over Christmas 2011.

Chasing Othello 
Sloan's second book in the series, Chasing Othello, takes place in Honolulu, again, but goes far beyond to the deserts of Dubai with the same cast of characters with a new villain hiding in plain sight sets out to destroy Cleopatra. Chasing Othello is another perfect cocktail of spy, thriller and romance.  Published December 2022

Changing Shoes
Sloan co-wrote the one-woman autobiographical play, Changing Shoes: One woman's search for the meaning of life in a closet full of shoes with director, Joe Plummer. She began touring the U.S. with the play in 2010; it had its world premiere at the Boca Grande Theater in Boca Grande, Florida.

Sloan has said about the play:
Changing Shoes is a play about change. It's a play about finding the courage to transform yourself, to learn how to twinkle again after your lights have been dimmed.   This play is for anyone who has ever stood in front of the mirror and asked, ‘Can I stay in the game?’ The answer is yes — you just have to change your shoes!

Sloan wrote a related book, Changing Shoes: Getting Older--NOT OLD--with Style, Humor, and Grace, published September 2010 by Gotham Books/Penguin Group in hardcover (224 pages). The book was also released in e-book format.

Spanning more than 40 years of her life, Changing Shoes begins when Tina has a chance encounter with an old pair of shoes while dressing for the Daytime Emmy Awards. The shoes launch Tina on a journey through her past, from sexy starlet to leading lady to daytime matriarch, ultimately forcing her to confront the question: “What do I have to do to remain vital?” As one of the characters in the play tells her: “Always wear your own shoes, otherwise your feet won’t know where to take you.”

Personal life
Tina married Steve McPherson in 1975. Their son, Renny, graduated from Harvard and served as a captain in the Marine Corps. He and his wife have three children.

She has competed in eight marathons, including the Honolulu, Los Angeles, New York, London and Paris marathons. She has climbed to the summit of Mt. Kilimanjaro in Africa and the Annapurna Refuge in Nepal.

Memberships
Sloan has served on the Board of Directors of Outward Bound, Central Park Bench Committee, and Harvard Parents Association.

References

External links

 Official Website
Changing Shoes website
Gotham Books/Penguin Group link
Interview: Guiding Light Actress, Tina Sloan talks Life, Spirituality and Shoes

1943 births
American film actresses
American soap opera actresses
American television actresses
American women writers
Living people
Manhattanville College alumni
21st-century American women